Kovoor Kunjumon is a member of 15th Kerala Legislative Assembly from Revolutionary Socialist Party (Leninist), representing Kunnathur constituency under Kollam district in Kerala. Kunjumon has won five times since 2001 from Kunnathur constituency.

References

1968 births
Living people
Kerala MLAs 2011–2016
Kerala MLAs 2016–2021
Kerala MLAs 2001–2006
Revolutionary Socialist Party (India) politicians
People from Kozhikode district
Kerala MLAs 2006–2011